Shu Huiguo (born July 1938) was a People's Republic of China politician. He was born in Jing'an County, Jiangxi. He was Chinese Communist Party Committee Secretary and People's Congress Chairman of his home province. He was a graduate of Jiangxi Agricultural University.

Footnotes

1938 births
People's Republic of China politicians from Jiangxi
Chinese Communist Party politicians from Jiangxi
People from Jing'an County
Jiangxi Agricultural University alumni
Living people
Politicians from Yichun, Jiangxi